Abu Ja'far Harun ibn Muhammad al-Mahdi or Harun ibn al-Mahdi (or 766 – 24 March 809), famously known as Harun al-Rashid, was the fifth Abbasid caliph of the Abbasid Caliphate, reigning from September 786 until his death in March 809. His reign is  traditionally regarded to be the beginning of the Islamic Golden Age. His epithet "al-Rashid" translates to "the Orthodox", "the Just", "the Upright", or "the Rightly-Guided".  

Harun established the legendary library Bayt al-Hikma ("House of Wisdom") in Baghdad in present-day Iraq, and during his rule Baghdad began to flourish as a world center of knowledge, culture and trade. During his rule, the family of Barmakids, which played a deciding role in establishing the Abbasid Caliphate, declined gradually. In 796, he moved his court and government to Raqqa in present-day Syria.

A Frankish mission came to offer Harun friendship in 799. Harun sent various presents with the emissaries on their return to Charlemagne's court, including a clock that Charlemagne and his retinue deemed to be a conjuration because of the sounds it emanated and the tricks it displayed every time an hour ticked. Portions of the fictional One Thousand and One Nights are set in Harun's court and some of its stories involve Harun himself. Harun's life and court have been the subject of many other tales, both factual and fictitious.

Early life
Hārūn was born in Rey, then part of Jibal in the Abbasid Caliphate, in present-day Tehran Province, Iran. He was the son of al-Mahdi, the third Abbasid caliph (r. 775–786), and his wife al-Khayzuran, (a former slave girl from Yemen) who was a woman of strong and independent personality who greatly and determinedly influenced affairs of state in the reigns of her husband and sons. Growing up Harun studied history, geography, rhetoric, music, poetry, and economics. However, most of his time was dedicated to mastering hadith and the Quran. In addition, he underwent advanced physical education as a future mujahid, and as a result, he practiced swordplay, archery, and learned the art of war. His birth date is debated, with various sources giving dates from 763 to 766. 

Before becoming a caliph, in 780 and again in 782, Hārūn had already nominally led campaigns against the Caliphate's traditional enemy, the Eastern Roman Empire, ruled by Empress Irene. The latter expedition was a huge undertaking, and even reached the Asian suburbs of Constantinople. According to the Muslim chronicler Al-Tabari, the Byzantines had lost tens of thousands of soldiers during Harun's campaign, and Harun employed 20,000 mules to carry the booty back. Upon his return to the Abbasid realm, the cost of a sword fell to one dirham and the price of a horse to a single gold Byzantine dinar.

Harun's raids against the Byzantines elevated his political image and once he returned, he was given the alias "al-Rashid", meaning "the Rightly-Guided One". He was promoted to crown prince and given the responsibility of governing the empire's western territories, from Syria to Azerbaijan.

Caliphate

Hārūn became caliph in 786 when he was in his early twenties. At the time, he was tall, good looking, and slim but strongly built, with wavy hair and olive skin. On the day of accession, his son al-Ma'mun was born, and al-Amin some little time later: the latter was the son of Zubaida, a granddaughter of al-Mansur (founder of the city of Baghdad); so he took precedence over the former, whose mother was a Persian. Upon his accession, Harun led Friday prayers in Baghdad's Great Mosque and then sat publicly as officials and the layman alike lined up to swear allegiance and declare their happiness at his ascent to Amir al-Mu'minin. He began his reign by appointing very able ministers, who carried on the work of the government so well that they greatly improved the condition of the people.

Under Hārūn al-Rashīd's rule, Baghdad flourished into the most splendid city of its period. Tribute paid by many rulers to the caliph funded architecture, the arts and court luxuries.

In 796, Hārūn moved the entire court to Raqqa on the middle Euphrates, where he spent 12 years, most of his reign. He appointed the Hanafi jurist Muhammad al-Shaybani as qadi (judge), but dismissed him in 803. He visited Baghdad only once. Several reasons may have influenced the decision to move to Raqqa: its closeness to the Byzantine border, its excellent communication lines via the Euphrates to Baghdad and via the Balikh river to the north and via Palmyra to Damascus, rich agricultural land, and the strategic advantage over any rebellion which might arise in Syria and the middle Euphrates area. Abu al-Faraj al-Isfahani, in his anthology of poems, depicts the splendid life in his court. In Raqqa the Barmakids managed the fate of the empire, and both heirs, al-Amin and al-Ma'mun, grew up there. At some point the royal court relocated again to Al-Rayy, the capital city of Khorasan, where the famous philologist and leader of the Kufan school, Al-Kisa'i, accompanied the caliph with his entourage. When al-Kisa'i became ill while in Al-Rayy, it is said that Harun visited him daily. It seems al-Shaybani and al-Kisa'i both died there on the same day in 804. Harun is quoted as saying: "Today Law and Language have died".

For the administration of the whole empire, he fell back on his mentor and longtime associate Yahya bin Khalid bin Barmak. Rashid appointed him as his vizier with full executive powers, and, for seventeen years, Yahya and his sons served Rashid faithfully in whatever assignment he entrusted to them.

Harun made pilgrimages to Mecca by camel ( from Baghdad) several times, e.g., 793, 795, 797, 802 and last in 803. Tabari concludes his account of Harun's reign with these words: "It has been said that when Harun ar-Rashid died, there were nine hundred million odd (dirhams) in the state treasury."

According to Shia belief, Harun imprisoned and poisoned Musa ibn Ja'far, the 7th Imam, in Baghdad.

Under al-Rashid, each city had its own law enforcement, which besides keeping order was supposed to examine the public markets in order to ensure, for instance, that proper scales and measures were used; enforce the payment of debts; and clamp down on illegal activities such as gambling, usury, and sales of alcohol.

Harun was a great patron of art and learning, and is best known for the unsurpassed splendor of his court and lifestyle. Some of the stories, perhaps the earliest, of "The Thousand and One Nights" were inspired by the glittering Baghdad court. The character King Shahryar (whose wife, Scheherazade, tells the tales) may have been based on Harun himself.

Advisors 

Hārūn was influenced by the full will of his powerful and influential mother in the governance of the empire until her death in 789. His vizier (chief minister) Yahya the Barmakid, Yahya's sons (especially Ja'far ibn Yahya), and other Barmakids generally controlled the administration. The position of Persians in the Abbasid caliphal court reached its peak during al-Rashid's reign.

The Barmakids were an Iranian family (from Balkh) that dated back to the Barmak, a hereditary Buddhist priest of Nava Vihara, who converted after the Islamic conquest of Balkh and became very powerful under al-Mahdi. Yahya had helped Hārūn to obtain the caliphate, and he and his sons were in high favor until 798, when the caliph threw them in prison and confiscated their land. Muhammad ibn Jarir al-Tabari dates this event to 803 and lists various reasons for it: Yahya's entering the Caliph's presence without permission; Yahya's opposition to Muhammad ibn al Layth, who later gained Harun's favour; and Ja'far's release of Yahya ibn Abdallah ibn Hasan, whom Harun had imprisoned.

The fall of the Barmakids is far more likely due to their behaving in a manner that Harun found disrespectful (such as entering his court unannounced) and making decisions in matters of state without first consulting him. Al-Fadl ibn al-Rabi succeeded Yahya the Barmakid as Harun's chief minister.

Diplomacy 

Both Einhard and Notker the Stammerer refer to envoys traveling between the courts of Harun and Charlemagne, king of the Franks, and entering friendly discussions about Christian access to holy sites and gift exchanges. Notker mentions Charlemagne sent Harun Spanish horses, colorful Frisian cloaks and impressive hunting dogs. In 802 Harun sent Charlemagne a present consisting of silks, brass candelabra, perfume, balsam, ivory chessmen, a colossal tent with many-colored curtains, an elephant named Abul-Abbas, and a water clock that marked the hours by dropping bronze balls into a bowl, as mechanical knights – one for each hour – emerged from little doors which shut behind them. The presents were unprecedented in Western Europe and may have influenced Carolingian art. This exchange of embassies was due to the fact that Harun was interested, like Charlemagne, in subduing the Umayyad emirs of Córdoba. Also, the common enmity against the Byzantines was what brought Harun closer to the contemporary Charlemagne.

When the Byzantine empress Irene was deposed in 802, Nikephoros I became emperor and refused to pay tribute to Harun, saying that Irene should have been receiving the tribute the whole time. News of this angered Harun, who wrote a message on the back of the Byzantine emperor's letter and said, "In the name of God the most merciful, From Amir al-Mu'minin Harun ar-Rashid, commander of the faithful, to Nikephoros, dog of the Romans. Thou shalt not hear, thou shalt behold my reply". After campaigns in Asia Minor, Nikephoros was forced to conclude a treaty, with humiliating terms. According to Dr Ahmad Mukhtar al-Abadi, it is due to the particularly fierce second retribution campaign against Nikephoros, that the Byzantine practically ceased any attempt to incite any conflict against the Abbasid again until the rule of Al-Ma'mun.

An alliance was established with the Chinese Tang dynasty by Ar-Rashid after he sent embassies to China. He was called "A-lun" in the Chinese Tang Annals. The alliance was aimed against the Tibetans.

When diplomats and messengers visited Harun in his palace, he was screened behind a curtain. No visitor or petitioner could speak first, interrupt, or oppose the caliph. They were expected to give their undivided attention to the caliph and calculate their responses with great care.

Rebellions 

Because of the Thousand and One Nights tales, Harun al-Rashid turned into a legendary figure obscuring his true historic personality. In fact, his reign initiated the political disintegration of the Abbasid caliphate. Syria was inhabited by tribes with Umayyad sympathies and remained the bitter enemy of the Abbasids, while Egypt witnessed uprisings against Abbasids due to maladministration and arbitrary taxation. The Umayyads had been established in Spain in 755, the Idrisids in Morocco in 788, and the Aghlabids in Ifriqiya (modern Tunisia) in 800. Besides, unrest flared up in Yemen, and the Kharijites rose in rebellion in Daylam, Kerman, Fars and Sistan. Revolts also broke out in Khorasan, and al-Rashid waged many campaigns against the Byzantines.

Al-Rashid appointed Ali bin Isa bin Mahan as the governor of Khorasan, who tried to bring to heel the princes and chieftains of the region, and to reimpose the full authority of the central government on them. This new policy met with fierce resistance and provoked numerous uprisings in the region.

Family 
Harun's first wife was Zubaidah. She was the daughter of his paternal uncle, Ja'far and maternal aunt Salsal, sister of Al-Khayzuran. They married in 781–82, at the residence of Muhammad bin Sulayman in Baghdad. She had one son, Caliph Al-Amin. She died in 831. Another of his wives was Azizah, daughter of Ghitrif, brother of Al-Khayzuran. She had been formerly married to Sulayman bin Abi Ja'far, who had divorced her. Another was Amat-al-Aziz Ghadir, who had been formerly a concubine of his brother al-Hadi. She had one son Ali. She died in 789. Another wife was Umm Muhammad, the daughter of Salih al-Miskin and Umm Abdullah, the daughter of Isa bin Ali. They married in November-December 803 in Al-Raqqah. She had been formerly been married to Ibrahim ibn al-Mahdi, who had repudiated her. Another wife married around the same year was Abbassah, daughter of Sulayman ibn Abi Ja'far. Another wife was Jurashiyyah al-Uthmanniyah. She was the daughter of Abdullah bin Muhammad, and had descended from Uthman, the third Caliph of the Rashidun.

Harun's earliest known concubine was Hailanah. She had been a slave girl of Yahya ibn Khalid, the Barmakid. It was she who begged him, while he was yet a prince, to take her away from the elderly Yahya. Harun then approached Yahya, who presented him with the girl. She died three years later in 789–90, and Harun mourned her deeply. Another concubine was Dananir. She was a Barmakid, and had been formerly a slave girl of Yahya ibn Khalid. She had been educated at Medina and had studied instrumental and vocal music. Another concubine was Marajil. She was a Persian, and came from distant Badhaghis in Persia. She was one of the ten maids presented to Harun. She gave birth to Abdullah (future caliph Al-Ma'mun) on the night of Harun's accession to the throne, in September 786, in whose birth she died. Her son was then adopted by Zubaidah. Another concubine was Qasif, mother of Al-Qasim. He was Harun's second son, born to a concubine mother. Harun's eldest daughter Sukaynah was also born to her.

Another concubine was Maridah. Her father was Shabib. She was a Sogdian, and was born in Kufah. She was one of the ten maids presented to Harun by Zubaidah. She had five children. These were Abu Ishaq (future Caliph Al-Mu'tasim), Abu Isma'il, Umm Habib, and two others whose names are unknown. She was Harun's favourite concubine. Some other favourite concubines were, Dhat al-Khal, Sihr, and Diya. Diya passed away, much to Harun's sorrow. Dhat al-Khal also known as Khubth was a songstress, belonging to a slave-dealer who was himself a freedman of Abbasah, the sister of Al-Rashid. She caught the fancy of Ibrahim al-Mausili, whose songs in praise of her soon reached Harun's attention, who bought her for the enormous sum of 70,000 dinars. She was the mother of Harun's son, Abu al-Abbas Muhammad. Sihr was mother of Harun's daughters, Khadijah and Karib. Another concubine was Inan. Her father was Abdullah. She was born and brought up in the Yamamah in central Arabia. She was a songstress and a poet, and had been a slave girl of Abu Khalid al-Natifi. She bore Harun two sons, both of whom died young. She accompanied him to Khurasan where he, and, soon after, she died. Another was Ghadid, also known as Musaffa, and she was mother of Harun's daughters, Hamdunah and Fatimah. She was his favourite concubine. Hamdunah and Fatimah married Al-Hadi's sons, Isma'il and Ja'far respectively.

Another of Harun's concubines was the captive daughter of a Greek churchman of Heraclea acquired with the fall of that city in 806. Zubaidah once more presented him with one of her personal maids who had caught his fancy. Harun's half-brother, while governor of Egypt from 795 to 797, also sent the him an Egyptian maid who immediately won his favour. Some other concubines were namely: Ri'm, mother of Salih; Irbah, mother of Abu Isa Muhammad; Sahdhrah, mother of Abu Yaqub Muhammad; Rawah, mother of Abu Sulayman Muhammad; Dawaj, mother of Abu Ali Muhammad; Kitman, mother of Abu Ahmad Muhammad; Hulab, mother of Arwa; Irabah, mother of Umm al-Hassan; Sukkar, mother of Umm Abiha; Rahiq, mother of Umm Salamah; Khzq, mother of Umm al-Qasim; Haly, mother of Umm Ja'far Ramlah; Aniq, mother of Umm Ali; Samandal, mother of Umm al-Ghaliyah; Zinah, mother of Raytah.

Anecdotes
Many anecdotes attached themselves to the person of Harun al-Rashid in the centuries following his rule. Saadi of Shiraz inserted a number of them into his Gulistan.

Al-Masudi relates a number of interesting anecdotes in The Meadows of Gold that illuminate the caliph's character. For example, he recounts Harun's delight when his horse came in first, closely followed by al-Ma'mun's, at a race that Harun held at Raqqa. Al-Masudi tells the story of Harun setting his poets a challenging task. When others failed to please him, Miskin of Medina succeeded superbly well. The poet then launched into a moving account of how much it had cost him to learn that song. Harun laughed and said that he did not know which was more entertaining, the song or the story. He rewarded the poet.

There is also the tale of Harun asking Ishaq ibn Ibrahim to keep singing. The musician did so until the caliph fell asleep. Then, strangely, a handsome young man appeared, snatched the musician's lute, sang a very moving piece (al-Masudi quotes it) and left. On awakening and being informed of that, Harun said Ishaq ibn Ibrahim had received a supernatural visitation.

Shortly before he died, Harun is said to have been reading some lines by Abu al-Atahiya about the transitory nature of the power and pleasures of this world, an anecdote related to other caliphs as well.

Every morning, Harun gave one thousand dirhams to charity and made one hundred prostrations a day. Harun famously used to look up at rain clouds in the sky and said: "rain where you like, but I will get the land tax!"

Harun was terrified for his soul in the afterlife. It was reported that he quickly cried when he thought of God and read poems about the briefness of life.

Soon after he became caliph, Harun asked his servant to bring him Ibn al-Sammak, a renowned scholar, to obtain wisdom from him. Harun asked al-Sammak what he would like to tell him. Al-Sammak replied, "I would like you always to remember that one day you will stand alone before your God. You will then be consigned either to Heaven or to Hell." That was too harsh for Harun's liking, and he was obviously disturbed. His servant cried out in protest that the Prince of the Faithful will definitely go to heaven after he has ruled justly on earth. However, al-Sammak ignored the interruption and looked straight into the eyes of Harun and said that "you will not have this man to defend you on that day."

An official, Maan ibn Zaidah, had fallen out of favor with Harun. When Harun saw him in court, he said that "you have grown old." The elderly man responded, "Yes, O Commander of the Faithful in your service." Harun replied, "But you have still some energy left." The old man replied that “what I have, is yours to dispose of as you wish... and I am bold in opposing your foes." Harun was satisfied with the encounter and made the man governor of Basra for his final years.

On hajj, he distributed large amounts of money to the people of Mecca and Medina and to poor pilgrims en route. He always took a number of ascetics with him, and whenever he was unable to go on pilgrimage, he sent dignitaries and three hundred clerics at his own expense.

One day, Harun was visiting a dignitary when he was struck by his beautiful slave. Harun asked the man to give her to him. The man obliged but was visibly disturbed by the loss. Afterward, Harun felt sorry for what he had done and gave her back.

Harun was an excellent horseman, enjoyed hunting (with Salukis, falcons, and hawks) and was fond of military exercises such as charging dummies with his sword. Harun was also the first Abbasid caliph to have played and promoted chess.

Harun desired a slave girl that was owned by an official named Isa who refused to give her to Harun, despite threats. Isa explained that he swore (in the middle of a sex act) that if he ever gave away or sold her, he would divorce his wife, free his slaves, and give all of his possessions to the impoverished. Yusuf, a judge and advisor to Harun, was called to arbitrate the case and to figure out a legal way for Isa to maintain his belongings even if Harun walked away with the girl. Yusuf decided that if Isa gave half of the girl to Harun and sold him the other half, it could not be said that Isa had either given her away or sold her, keeping his promise.

Harun had an anxious soul and supposedly was prone to walk the streets of Baghdad at night. At times Ja'far ibn Yahya accompanied him. The night-time tours likely arose from a genuine and sympathetic concern in the well-being of his people, for it is said that he was assiduous to relieve any of their trials and tend to their needs.

Death 

A major revolt led by Rafi ibn al-Layth was started in Samarqand which forced Harun al-Rashid to move to Khorasan. He first removed and arrested Ali bin Isa bin Mahan but the revolt continued unchecked. (Harun had dismissed Ali and replaced him with Harthama ibn A'yan, and in 808 marched himself east to deal with the rebel Rafi ibn al-Layth, but died in March 809 while at Tus). Harun al-Rashid became ill and died very soon after when he reached Sanabad village in Tus and was buried in Dar al-Imarah, the summer palace of Humayd ibn Qahtaba, the Abbasid governor of Khorasan. Due to this historical event, the Dar al-Imarah was known as the Mausoleum of Haruniyyeh. The location later became known as Mashhad ("The Place of Martyrdom") because of the martyrdom of Imam al-Ridha in 818.

Legacy 
Al-Rashid become a prominent figure in the Islamic and Arab culture, he has been described as one of the most famous Arabs in history. All the abbassid caliphs after him were his descendants. 

About his accession famous scholar Mosuli said:

About his reign, Famous Arab historian Al-Masudi said:

Al-Rashid become the progenitor of subsequent Abbasid caliphs. Al-Rashid nominated his son Muhammad al-Amin as his first heir. Muhammad had an elder half-brother, Abdallah, the future al-Ma'mun, who had been born in September 786 (six months older than him) However, Abdallah's mother was a Persian concubine, and his pure Abbasid lineage gave Muhammad seniority over his half-brother. Indeed, he was the only Abbasid caliph to claim such descent. Already in 792, Harun had Muhammad receive the oath of allegiance (bay'ah) with the name of al-Amīn ("The Trustworthy"), effectively marking him out as his main heir, while Abdallah was not named second heir, under the name al-Maʾmūn ("The Trusted One") until 799. and his third son Qasim was nominated third heir, however he never became caliph.
Among his sons, al-Amin became caliph after his death in 809. Al-Amin ruled from 809 to 813, until a civil war broke between him and his brother Abdallah al-Ma'mun (Governor of Khorasan). The reason of war were that caliph al-Amin tried to remove al-Ma'mun as his heir. Al-Ma'mun became caliph in 813 and ruled the caliphate for two decades until 833. He was succeeded by another of Harun's son Abu Ishaq Muhammad (better known as Al-Mu'tasim), his mother was Marida, a concubine.

In popular culture

In Shinobu Ohtaka's Magi: The Labyrinth of Magic, the former king of Balbadd is called Rashid Saluja. In the spin-off Adventure of Sinbad, Rashid's alias is Harun.
Henry Wadsworth Longfellow wrote a short poem titled "Haroun Al Raschid".
O. Henry uses the character in his story "The Caliph And The Cad". The theme of the story is "turning the tables on Haroun al Raschid".
Alfred Tennyson wrote a poem in his youth entitled "Recollections Of The Arabian Nights". Every stanza (except the last one) ends with "of good Haroun Alraschid".
Harun al-Rashid was a main figure and character in several of the stories in some of the oldest versions of the One Thousand and One Nights.

The Indian television series Alif Laila (1993–1997), an adaptation of the Arabian Nights, features several tales involving the caliph from the classic collection of stories. 
Hārūn ar-Rashīd figures throughout James Joyce's Ulysses, in a dream of Stephen Dedalus, one of the protagonists. Stephen's efforts to recall this dream continue throughout the novel, culminating in the novel's fifteenth episode, wherein some characters also take on the guise of Hārūn.
  Harun al-Rashid is celebrated in a 1923 poem by W. B. Yeats, "The Gift of Harun al-Rashid".
 A story of one of Harun's wanderings provides the climax to the narrative game of titles at the end of Italo Calvino's If on a winter's night a traveler (1979). In Calvino's story, Harun wanders at night, only to be drawn into a conspiracy in which he is selected to assassinate the Caliph Harun-al-Rashid.
In Charles Dickens' 1842 travelogue, American Notes for General Circulation, he compares American supporters of slavery to the "Caliph Harun al-Rashid in his angry robe of scarlet".
The two protagonists of Salman Rushdie's 1990 novel Haroun and the Sea of Stories are Haroun and his father Rashid Khalifa.

In the Sten science fiction novels by Allan Cole and Chris Bunch, the character of the Eternal Emperor uses the name "H. E. Raschid" when incognito; this is confirmed, in the final book of the series, as a reference to the character from Burton's translation of The Book of the Thousand Nights and a Night.
The movie The Golden Blade (1952), starring Rock Hudson and Piper Laurie depicts the adventures of Harun who uses a magic sword to free a fairy-tale Baghdad from Jafar, the evil usurper of the throne. After he finally wins the hand of princess Khairuzan she awards him the title Al-Rashid ("the righteous").
The comic book The Sandman features a story (issue 50, "Ramadan") set in the world of the One Thousand and One Nights, with Hārūn ar-Rashīd as the protagonist. It highlights his historical and mythical role as well as his discussion of the transitory nature of power. The story is included in the collection The Sandman: Fables and Reflections.
Haroun El Poussah in the French comic strip Iznogoud is a satirical version of Hārūn ar-Rashīd.
In Quest for Glory II, the sultan who adopts the Hero as his son is named Hārūn ar-Rashīd. He is often seen prophesying on the streets of Shapeir as The Poet Omar.
Harun al-Rashid appears as the leader of Arabia in the video game Civilization V. 
Future US President Theodore Roosevelt, when he was a New York Police Department Commissioner, was called in the local newspapers "Haroun-al-Roosevelt".
In The Master and Margarita, by novelist Mikhail Bulgakov, Harun al-Rashid is referenced by the character Korovyev in which he warns a door man not to judge him "by [his] suit", and to reference the story of "the famous caliph, Harun al-Rashid".

In the 1924 film Waxworks, a poet is hired by a wax museum proprietor to write back-stories for three wax models. Among these wax models is Harun al-Rashid, played by Emil Jannings.
In the 2006 novel Variable Star by Robert Heinlein and Spider Robinson, chapter 1 is prefaced with a quotation from Alfred, Lord Tennyson's "Recollections of the Arabian Nights" regarding "good Harun Alrashid", the relevance of which becomes apparent in chapter 2 when one character relates stories (probably apocryphal and presumably drawn from Tennyson) of Harun al-Rahsid to another character in order to use them as an analogy.
The second chapter in the novel Prince Otto by Robert Louis Stevenson has the title "In which the Prince Plays Haroun al-Raschid".
Haroun al-Rashid has a character page in the video game Crusader Kings II, and it is possible to play as his descendants of the Abbasid dynasty.
Harun al-Rashid appears in the children's comic book Mampato, in the stories "Bromiznar de Bagdad" and "Ábrete Sesamo", by the Chilean author Themo Lobos. In this story, al-Rashid is shown at first as lazy and indolent, but after a series of adventures he decides to take the leading role against an evil vizier and help the main character, Mampato.
Frank Lloyd Wright designed a monument to al-Rashid as part of his proposed 1957 urban renewal plan for Baghdad, Iraq.
In his book The Power Broker, Robert Caro compares New York City mayor Fiorello H. La Guardia to Harun al-Rashid in the way each "roam[ed] his domain."
The Syrian television series Harun Al-Rashid (2018), starring Kosai Khauli, Karis Bashar, and Yasser Al-Masri focuses on Harun and his relation with his brother Caliph Al-Hadi, and that preceded Harun's ascent to the Caliphate. It also focuses on his relations with his elder sons and nomination of Al-Amin and Al-Ma'mun as heir.

See also
Isma'il ibn Salih ibn Ali al-Hashimi
Abd al-Malik ibn Salih

References

Citations

Notes

Sources

Further reading

al-Masudi, The Meadows of Gold, The Abbasids, transl. Paul Lunde and Caroline Stone, Kegan paul, London and New York, 1989
al-Tabari "The History of al-Tabari" volume XXX "The 'Abbasid Caliphate in Equilibrium" transl. C.E. Bosworth, SUNY, Albany, 1989.

St John Philby. Harun al Rashid (London: P. Davies) 1933.
Einhard and Notker the Stammerer, "Two Lives of Charlemagne," transl. Lewis Thorpe, Penguin, Harmondsworth, 1977 (1969)
 John H. Haaren, Famous Men of the Middle Ages 
 William Muir, K.C.S.I., The Caliphate, its rise, decline, and fall 
Theophanes, "The Chronicle of Theophanes," transl. Harry Turtledove, University of Pennsylvania Press, Philadelphia, 1982

External links

  (PDF version)

 
760s births
809 deaths
Year of birth uncertain

People from Ray, Iran
Arab Muslims
One Thousand and One Nights characters
8th-century rulers in Africa
8th-century Abbasid caliphs
9th-century Abbasid caliphs
9th-century rulers in Africa
Abbasid people of the Arab–Byzantine wars
Sons of Abbasid caliphs
Burials at Imam Reza Shrine